The following lists events that happened during 1996 in Zaire.

Incumbents 
 President: Mobutu Sese Seko
 Prime Minister: Léon Kengo wa Dondo

Events

Births 

 5 March - Emmanuel Mudiay, basketball player

See also

 Zaire
 History of the Democratic Republic of the Congo
 First Congo War

References

Sources

 
Years of the 20th century in Zaire
Zaire
1990s in Zaire
Zaire